Joseph Mero (born  1965) is an American former pair skater. With his skating partner, Katy Keeley, he won silver at the 1984 St. Ivel International, gold at the 1986 Skate America, bronze at the 1987 Skate Canada International, bronze at the 1987 NHK Trophy, and bronze at the 1988 Grand Prix International de Paris. They are four-time U.S. national medalists, having won bronze in 1987 and 1989, and pewter in 1986 and 1988.

Personal life 
Joseph Mero was born  1965. His father, Joseph Mero Sr., worked at a paper plant in Detroit, and his mother, Bernie, had emphysema.

Skating career

Early career 
Mero began roller skating as a five-year-old and switched to ice skating six years later. Competing with Maria Lako, he placed 5th in junior pairs at the 1983 U.S. Championships. He and Tammy Crowson won the junior bronze medal at the 1984 U.S. Championships.

Partnership with Keeley 
Mero teamed up with Katy Keeley in 1984. John Nicks served as their coach throughout their career as a pair.

Keeley/Mero's first international medal, a silver, came at the 1984 St. Ivel International in England. They stepped onto a national podium for the first time at the 1986 U.S. Championships, taking the pewter medal for fourth place. The following season, they won gold at the 1986 Skate America and bronze at the 1987 U.S. Championships.

In the 1987–1988 Olympic season, Keeley/Mero won bronze at the 1987 Skate Canada International and 1987 NHK Trophy before placing fourth at the 1988 U.S. Championships. In 1988, Keeley sustained a concussion at an ice show in London.

1988–1989 was Keeley/Mero's fifth season together. Granted free ice time at the Ice Capades Chalet in Costa Mesa, California, the pair was training on-ice daily from 9 a.m. to 1 p.m. They won the bronze medal at the 1988 Grand Prix International de Paris and then received bronze at the 1989 U.S. Championships. After nationals, they decided to retire from competition.

Partnership with Urbanski 

He skated one season with Calla Urbanski in 1993-1994,winning the Eastern Sectionals but placing 7th at the 1994 U.S. Figure Skating Championships.

Ban by USFSA 
He is now banned for life from the USFSA and Professional Skaters Association after a hearing found him guilty of Code of Ethics violations relating to harassment and abuse.

Competitive highlights

With Keeley

With Lako and Crowson

With Calla Urbanski

References 

1960s births
American male pair skaters
Living people
Figure skaters from Detroit